The 2012 Summer Paralympics, the fourteenth Summer Paralympic Games, and also more generally known as the London 2012 Paralympic Games, was a major international multi-sport event for the disabled governed by the International Paralympic Committee, that took place in London, United Kingdom from 29 August to 9 September.

There was competition in 503 events in 26 sports, and there were a total of 1522 medals awarded.

{| id="toc" class="toc" summary="Contents"
|-
| style="text-align:center;"|Contents
|-
|
Archery
Athletics
Boccia
Cycling
Equestrian
Football 5-a-side
|valign=top|
Football 7-a-side
Goalball
Judo
Powerlifting
Rowing
Sailing
Shooting
Swimming
|valign=top|
Table tennis
Volleyball
Wheelchair basketball
Wheelchair fencing
Wheelchair rugby
Wheelchair tennis
|}


Archery

Men's events

Women's events

Athletics

T/F11–13

Men's events

Women's events

T/F20

Men's events

Women's events

T/F31–38

Men's events

(*) F51 competitor

Women's events

F40

Women's events

T/F42–46

Men's events

Women's events

T/F51–58

Men's events

(*) class F32 athlete

Women's events

Boccia

Cycling

Road cycling

Men's events

Women's events

Mixed events

Track cycling

Men's events

Women's events

Mixed events

Equestrian

Football 5-a-side

Football 7-a-side

Goalball

Judo

Men's events

Women's events

Powerlifting

Women's events

Men's events

Rowing

Sailing

Shooting

Swimming

Men's events

Women's events

Table tennis

Men's events

Women's events

Volleyball

Wheelchair basketball

Wheelchair fencing

Men's events

Women's events

Wheelchair rugby

Wheelchair tennis

External links
Official website
Medal winners

Medal winners
2012 Summer Paralympics medal winners
2012 Summer Paralympics medal winners
2012 Summer Paralympics medal winners